Rex Andrew Walters (born March 12, 1970) is an American professional basketball coach and former player who serves as an assistant coach for the Charlotte Hornets of the National Basketball Association (NBA). Previously, he was the associate head coach at Wake Forest University under Danny Manning. Prior to Wake Forest, he spent time at Nevada under Eric Musselman. He has made head coaching stops with the Grand Rapid Drive (NBA G-League), the University of San Francisco and Florida Atlantic University. 

Walters pedigree for coaching began as a player, receiving tutelage from some of the game legendary coaches. Roy Williams at the University of Kansas and the NBA's Chuck Daly, Larry Brown and Pat Riley all mentored Walters during his years as a player. Walters played college basketball at Northwestern and Kansas. In 1993, he received a Bachelor of Science in Education degree from the University of Kansas. After Kansas, he played professionally for ten years, including seven seasons in the NBA from 1993 to 2000. Walters has been active on Apple Podcasts hosting his own show Real Talk Basketball with Rex Walters.

Biography
Born in Omaha, Nebraska on March 12, 1970, Walters played high school basketball at Piedmont Hills High School in San Jose, California, but graduated from Independence High School in San Jose, California. Walters is biracial; his mother is Japanese and his father is white. In an interview with Rick Quan, Rex Walters responded to the question of feeling that he was a pioneer for Asian Americans. He responded: "I consider myself Japanese-American. I just don't look it. People are always surprised. Now we got a guy like Jeremy Lin breaking barriers, I'd like to think I played a small part in that". He later added, "People ask me who I am? What I am? I am a Japanese-American, I take great pride in that." Walters is known as a hard working, selfless person with a great passion to motivate and lead others. Walters daughter, Addison Walters is currently with the Minnesota Timberwolves staff serving as a Video Associate.

Playing career (College) 
(1988-1990) Walters played at Northwestern University (1988-1990) and was All Big 10 honorable mention leading the team in scoring (17.6PPG, 3FG% - 47.3%, FT% - 79.4%, 125 assists).

(1990-1993) In 1990, he transferred to Kansas, playing two seasons. In 68 starts under Roy Williams, he averaged 15.6 points per game, leading the Jayhawks in scoring during both his junior and senior campaigns. KU combined to go 56-12 overall in 1991-92 and 1992–93, winning back-to-back Big Eight titles and reaching the 1993 Final Four. Walters was named to the All-Big Eight team both seasons and was Big Eight Male Athlete of the Year as a senior in 1993. As a junior, Walters averaged 16.0 points per game as the Jayhawks went 27–5. In his senior season, KU had a record of 29–7, with Walters scoring at a clip of 15.3 points per game.

Walters was an outstanding scorer from all areas of the court at Kansas, shooting nearly 51% from the field, 42% from three-point range and 85% at the free throw line. His college career originally began at Northwestern University, where he earned honorable mention from the Big 10 in 1989-90 after leading the team in scoring (17.6 ppg), three-point shooting (47.3%), free throw shooting (79.4%) and assists (125) as a sophomore. The 6'4" (1.93 m) shooting guard was selected by the National Basketball Association's New Jersey Nets with the 16th pick in the 1993 NBA draft.

Playing career (Professional) 
Walters’ professional playing career spanned 10 seasons, including seven seasons in the NBA with the New Jersey Nets (1993–95), Philadelphia 76ers (1995-98) and Miami Heat (1998-2000). He also had stints with Baloncesto Leon (2000), the Kansas City Knights (2000–01; 2002–03) and CB Gran Canaria (2001-02).

The New Jersey Nets selected Walters with the 16th overall pick in the 1993 NBA draft. As a rookie, Walters led the team in field goal percentage (.522) and hit 14 of 28 three-point attempts. His role expanded in 1994-95 and his statistics improved in nearly every category.

In 1995–96, Walters was dealt to the Philadelphia 76ers and started the last eight games of the season. He played in 59 games for Philadelphia in 1996–97, making 16 starts behind Allen Iverson and Jerry Stackhouse. He led the team in three-point shooting with a .384 mark while averaging 6.8 points a game. He played in 38 games in 1997–98, splitting the season between Philadelphia and Miami, which signed him after he was waived by the Sixers in January of ’98. He appeared in 33 games (13 starts) for the Heat in 1998-99 and averaged 3.1 points a game. After leaving the NBA, Walters played for León and Gran Canaria in Spain. In addition to his playing career, Walters had a minor role in the 1994 film Blue Chips starring Nick Nolte and Shaquille O'Neal.

Coaching career
(2002-2003) Blue Valley NW High School, Assistant Coach, winning the Kansas Class 6A State Tournament.

(2003-2005) Valparaiso University, Assistant Coach accomplishing much with head coach Homer Drew. The Crusaders were the Mid Continent Conference Regular Season and Tournament Champions (2004) advancing to the 2004 NCAA tournament. Walters was ranked the 20th best assistant basketball coach in the country at the mid-major level by The Hoop Scoop online in 2005.

(2006-2008) Florida Atlantic University, Head Coach.

(2008-2016) The University of San Francisco, Head Coach. April 15, 2008 Walters was hired to replace Eddie Sutton who was hired to replace Jesse Evans.

(2016-2017) On June 29, 2016, Walters was named the head coach of the Grand Rapids Drive. Two players were called up to the Detroit Pistons during his time, Jordan Crawford and Ray McCallum.

(2017-2018) On July 1, 2017, Walters was named an assistant coach for the Detroit Pistons. Working for Stan Van Gundy the Detroit Pistons had a defensive rating of 10th in the NBA.

(2018-2019) Walters was hired by Eric Musselman as Special Assistant to the head coach at Nevada. The Wolf Pack were pre-season #5 in the nation, Mountain West Conference Champions and a 7 seed in the 2018 NCAA tournament.

(2019-2020) Walters joined the Wake Forest basketball program in May 2019 as an Associate Head Coach under Danny Manning.

(2020-2021) On November 16, 2020, Walters was hired as assistant coach by the New Orleans Pelicans.

Head coaching record

References

External links

 University of San Francisco biography
 

1970 births
Living people
American men's basketball coaches
American men's basketball players
American sportspeople of Japanese descent
Basketball coaches from Nebraska
Basketball players from Nebraska
Basketball players from San Jose, California
CB Gran Canaria players
Charlotte Hornets assistant coaches
College men's basketball head coaches in the United States
Detroit Pistons assistant coaches
Florida Atlantic Owls men's basketball coaches
Grand Rapids Drive coaches
Kansas Jayhawks men's basketball players
Kansas City Knights players
Liga ACB players
Miami Heat players
Nevada Wolf Pack men's basketball coaches
New Jersey Nets draft picks
New Jersey Nets players
New Orleans Pelicans assistant coaches
Northwestern Wildcats men's basketball players
Philadelphia 76ers players
San Francisco Dons men's basketball coaches
Shooting guards
Sportspeople from Omaha, Nebraska
Valparaiso Beacons men's basketball coaches
Wake Forest Demon Deacons men's basketball coaches